Dundonald House (Ulster-Scots: Dundoanal Haa) is a government building in Belfast, Northern Ireland. It is situated in the Stormont Estate along with several other Northern Ireland Civil Service buildings. It is the headquarters of the Department of Agriculture and Rural Development and Northern Ireland Prison Service.

See also 

 Northern Ireland Office

References

External links 
 Northern Ireland Civil Service
 

Government buildings in Northern Ireland
Office buildings in the United Kingdom